Nykirken is a church in the city of Bergen in Vestland county, Norway.

Nykirken, Nykirke, or Ny Kirke (lit. "new church") may also refer to:

Churches
 Ny Kirke, a church in the village of Nyker, on the island of Bornholm, Denmark
 Nykirken, also known as the Vestre Gausdal Church, a church in Gausdal municipality in Innlandet county, Norway
 Nykirke Church, a church in the village of Nykirke in Horten municipality in Vestfold og Telemark county, Norway
 Nykirke (Innlandet), a church in Gjøvik municipality in Innlandet county, Norway
 Nykirke (Viken), a church in Modum municipality in Viken county, Norway

Villages
 Nykirke, a village in Horten municipality, Vestfold og Telemark county, Norway

See also
 New Church (disambiguation)